Roger Van de Casteele (born 13 July 1913, date of death unknown) was a French water polo player who competed in the 1936 Summer Olympics.

He was part of the French team which finished fourth in the 1936 tournament. He played all seven matches.

References

External links
Part 2: The Water Polo Tournament
Roger Van de Casteele's profile at Sports Reference.com

1913 births
Year of death missing
French male water polo players
Olympic water polo players of France
Water polo players at the 1936 Summer Olympics